The Tri-Cities Fire were a professional indoor football team based out of Kennewick, Washington, with home games at the Toyota Center during the 2019 season. They were owned by Kinshasa Martin of Rampage Sports Entertainment, LLC. They folded in February 2020 after playing one season, citing lack of support from sponsors and ticket sales.

History
On October 15, 2018, the American West Football Conference was founded by the Idaho Horsemen and added the Fire and two other teams to the league: the Reno Express, and Wenatchee Valley Skyhawks. The Fire were the first indoor football team in the Tri-Cities following the departure of the Tri-Cities Fever of the Indoor Football League in 2016. Despite being announced in October 2018, they were one of the last AWFC teams to sign a lease with the arena in January 2019.

Their season began on March 23, 2019, in a 42–24 loss at Reno. After a 0–5 start to their inaugural season, the Fire fired head coach Warren Reynolds and was replaced by defensive coordinator Kevin Heard. The Fire finished the season losing all twelve games. The team abruptly folded two weeks prior to the planned start of the 2020 season.

2019 standings

References

External links
 Official website
 American West Football Conference website

American football teams in Washington (state)
American football teams established in 2018
2018 establishments in Washington (state)
Sports in the Tri-Cities, Washington
Kennewick, Washington